Schull and Skibbereen Light Railway 1 and 3 were two  locomotives manufactured by Peckett and Sons in 1906 and 1914 respectively. They were the Schull and Skibbereen Railway's fifth and sixth locomotives, and took the numbers of withdrawn locomotives.

History
The first member of this class was numbered "No. 1" and named "Gabriel", replacing the original No. 1, named "Marion", which was scrapped on its arrival.

The second locomotive in this class was also built by Peckett and Sons and delivered to the railway in 1914. This locomotive was numbered "No. 3" and originally named "Consiliation" but later renamed "Kent". This replaced the original No. 3, named "Ilen" which was scrapped when the new locomotive arrived.

Both locomotives passed to the Great Southern Railways in the 1925 amalgamation. The GSR added an "" suffix to the running number, and classified both locomotives as Class 1 or Class DN4. No. 1 was withdrawn and scrapped in 1936; but No.3 survived until nationalisation when it passed to Córas Iompair Éireann. Eventually, it was withdrawn and scrapped in 1953.

Preservation
The S&S pair were two of a class of five engines, two others went to Borneo and were scrapped , whilst the last is currently preserved on the Bay of Islands Vintage Railway in New Zealand.

References

External links
Irish narrow gauge locomotives by railway
 

Steam locomotives of Ireland
4-4-0T locomotives
Peckett locomotives
Railway locomotives introduced in 1905
3 ft gauge locomotives
Scrapped locomotives